Carlos Eduardo Gallardo Nájera (born 8 April 1984) is a Guatemalan professional football defender for Primera División club Barberena.

Club career
A tall defender, Gallardo played for Comunicaciones before joining Deportivo Jalapa in 2007. He returned to the Cremas for the 2008/2009 Apertura.

International career
He made his debut for Guatemala in an April 2008 friendly match against Haiti. He has earned 11 caps at the start of February 2010, including 6 qualifying matches for the 2010 FIFA World Cup.

International goals
Scores and results list. Guatemala's goal tally first.

Honours
Jalapa
Liga Nacional de Guatemala: Apertura 2007

Comunicaciones 
Liga Nacional de Guatemala: Apertura 2010, Clausura 2011, Clausura 2015

Guastatoya 
Liga Nacional de Guatemala: Clausura 2018, Apertura 2018

Municipal 
Liga Nacional de Guatemala: Apertura 2019

External links
 Player profile - CSD Comunicaciones

References

1984 births
Living people
Sportspeople from Guatemala City
Guatemalan footballers
Guatemala international footballers
Comunicaciones F.C. players
2009 UNCAF Nations Cup players
2011 Copa Centroamericana players
2011 CONCACAF Gold Cup players
2014 Copa Centroamericana players
Association football defenders
C.S.D. Municipal players